Darbourne may refer to:

John Darbourne (1935–1991), British architect
Darbourne & Darke, British firm of architects and landscape planners